The Bobenthaler Knopf ("Bobenthal Knob") is a hill, , in the southeastern Wasgau, the name given to the region covering the southern part of the Palatine Forest in Germany and the northern part of the Vosges in France.

The hill is located entirely within the territory of the municipality of Bobenthal, from which it derives its name. In the west it descends relatively gently to the valley of the Wieslauter stream; in the east it drops considerably more steeply into the valley of the Reisbach. The Bobenthaler Kopf is covered by mixed woods. A footpath leads to the summit from the south. It forms the centre of the  Bobenthaler Knopf Core Zone in the Palatine Forest Nature Park. About  to the south lie the Rittersteins of Löffelkreuz and Eselsschleifhäuschen.

References 

Mountains and hills of Rhineland-Palatinate
Mountains and hills of the Palatinate Forest